Jan Gonda (14 April 1905 – 28 July 1991) was a Dutch Indologist and the first Utrecht professor of Sanskrit. He was born in Gouda, in the Netherlands, and died in Utrecht. He studied with Willem Caland at Rijksuniversiteit, Utrecht (since 1990 Universiteit Utrecht) and from 1932 held positions at Utrecht and Leiden. He held the positions of Chair of Sanskrit succeeding Caland from 1929, as well as of Indology from 1932. He published scholarly articles on Indian Sanskrit and Indonesian Javanese texts for sixty years. In 1952, he published his monumental work on Sanskrit in Indonesia. His contributions to philology and Vedic literature has been oft-cited. 
 
Gonda is recognized as one of the twentieth century's leading scholars of Asian language, literature and religion, particularly on texts and topics related to Hinduism and Buddhism. He wrote with ease and elegance in Dutch, English and German, and had a breath-taking range of interests from the ancient literature of Indonesia and India to comparative religion and philology. Like many Orientalists of the 20th century, Gonda never visited Asia although some of his publications appeared under the auspices of the "Koninklijk Bataviaasch Genootschap van Kunsten en Wetenschappen", e.g. his comparative study on the Kavi-edition of the "Bhīşmaparwa", printed in Bandung (Java), 1937. 
However, his lack of field experience was more than compensated for by his encyclopedic knowledge of Indic literature and his profound empathy for the religious culture of Asia. Among his many students was J. A. B. van Buitenen who moved to the University of Chicago in 1961, and Henk Bodewitz succeeded Gonda to the chair of Sanskrit at Utrecht in 1976.

Gonda left a bequest to Royal Netherlands Academy of Arts and Sciences, of which he was member since 1957, and in 1992 the Gonda Foundation was set up in his name. The foundation offers publication subsidies and grants to projects relating to Indology, the size of the grants and scope of activities being determined by the return on invested capital. The Gonda Lectures and Gonda Indological Series are also named in his honour.

Publications
Gonda produced a substantial number of books and articles during his long career. The most useful starting point is Jan Gonda, Selected Studies, 6 vols. (Leiden: E. J. Brill, 1975-1991). These volumes contain most of his key articles.

References

External links
 The Gonda Fund at the Royal Netherlands Academy of Arts and Sciences website
 The Gonda Lectures at the Royal Netherlands Academy of Arts and Sciences website
Gonda Indological Series at the Brill website
Gonda entry at the "Dutch Studies on South Asia, Tibet and Classical Southeast Asia" website

Dutch Indologists
1905 births
1991 deaths
Members of the Royal Netherlands Academy of Arts and Sciences
Utrecht University alumni
People from Gouda, South Holland
University of Chicago faculty